Tutunsez (also Romanized as Tūtūnsez; also known as Tutunsas, Tūtūnsīn, Tūtūnsīz, Tutunsus, and Tyutyunsis) is a village in Yurchi-ye Sharqi Rural District, Kuraim District, Nir County, Ardabil Province, Iran. At the 2006 census, its population was 323, in 62 families.

References 

Towns and villages in Nir County